Dacuronium bromide (INN, BAN) (developmental code name NB-68) is an aminosteroid neuromuscular blocking agent which was never marketed. It acts as a competitive antagonist of the nicotinic acetylcholine receptor (nAChR).

References

Muscle relaxants
Nicotinic antagonists
Quaternary ammonium compounds
Abandoned drugs
Neuromuscular blockers
Cyclopentanols
Piperidines
Acetate esters
Bromides